is a CD single by Japanese singer and voice actress Aya Hirano. It was first released on September 6, 2006, and produced by Lantis.

Track listing

References

"The unstoppable Aya Hirano's third single 'Ashita no Prism'". (December 2006) Newtype USA. p. 119.

External links
 

2006 singles
Aya Hirano songs
Lantis (company) singles
2006 songs